Trailing cones (or trailing wires as they are often incorrectly called or trailing static cones), were first developed and tested in the 1950s and 1960s as a simple means of calibrating the static pressure (altitude reporting) error of an aircraft's pitot-static system. It does this by giving an accurate measurement of the ambient atmospheric pressure (static pressure) well clear of the aircraft's fuselage.  The trailing cone system trails at least one fuselage length behind the aircraft (SpaceAge Control) via a high-strength pressure tube.  Static pressure is measured forward of the cone by several static ports. The cone stabilizes and aligns the ports relative to the freestream airflow.

The FAA states in Advisory Circular AC 91-85A:
"Where precision flight calibrations are used to quantify or verify altimetry system performance they may be accomplished by any of the following methods.  Flight calibrations should only be performed once appropriate ground checks have been completed.  Uncertainties in application of the method must be assessed and taken into account in the data package.

Precision static pressure measurement methods
 Precision tracking radar in conjunction with pressure calibration of atmosphere at test altitude.
 Trailing cone.               
 Chase aircraft.
 Any other method acceptable to the approving authority.

See also
Reduced vertical separation minima
Static pressure

References

Guidance Material on the Approval of Operators/Aircraft for RVSM Operations
Trailing Cones for RVSM Certification and Flight Test
NASA TM-104316
SpaceAge Control - Trailing Cones for RVSM Certification and Flight Test

External links
 Trailing Cone Static Source (Bede Design No. 28)
 Position Error Calibration of a Pressure Survey Aircraft Using a Trailing Cone
 100101 Trailing Cone

Avionics